These are the official results of the Women's 400 metres hurdles event at the 1982 European Championships in Athens, Greece, held at Olympic Stadium "Spiros Louis" on 9 and 10 September 1982.

Medalists

Final
10 September

Heats
9 September

Participation
According to an unofficial count, 16 athletes from 11 countries participated in the event.

  (1)
  (2)
  (1)
  (1)
  (1)
  (1)
  (3)
  (2)
  (1)
  (1)
  (2)

See also
 1978 Women's European Championships 400m Hurdles (Prague)
 1983 Women's World Championships 400m Hurdles (Helsinki)
 1984 Women's Olympic 400m Hurdles (Moscow)
 1986 Women's European Championships 400m Hurdles (Stuttgart)
 1987 Women's World Championships 400m Hurdles (Rome)
 1988 Women's Olympic 400m Hurdles (Seoul)

References

 Results

400 metres hurdles
400 metres hurdles at the European Athletics Championships
1982 in women's athletics